Ioannis Andreou was a Greek swimmer.  He competed at the 1896 Summer Olympics in Athens.

Andreou competed in the 1,200 metres freestyle event. He placed second of the seven swimmers, with a time of 21:03.4.  The winner, Alfréd Hajós, had finished in 18:22.2.

References

External links

Year of birth missing
Year of death missing
Greek male swimmers
Swimmers at the 1896 Summer Olympics
19th-century sportsmen
Olympic swimmers of Greece
Olympic silver medalists for Greece
Olympic silver medalists in swimming
Medalists at the 1896 Summer Olympics
Greek male freestyle swimmers
Place of birth missing
Place of death missing